The women's 4 × 5 kilometre relay at the 2017 Asian Winter Games was held on 24 February 2017 at the Shirahatayama Open Stadium in Sapporo, Japan.

Schedule
All times are Japan Standard Time (UTC+09:00)

Results

References

External links
Results at FIS website

Women Relay